Zonocypretta kalimna is a species of ostracod crustacean in the family Cyprididae. It is endemic to Australia.

References

External links
 
 

Cyprididae
Podocopida genera
Monotypic crustacean genera
Freshwater crustaceans of Australia
Vulnerable fauna of Australia
Taxonomy articles created by Polbot